Badlan (also Romanized as Badlān, Badalan, and Bādelān; also known as Bādlūn) is a village in Donbaleh Rud-e Jonubi Rural District, Dehdez District, Izeh County, Khuzestan Province, Iran. At the 2006 census, its population was 155, in 21 families.

References 

Populated places in Izeh County